Biting Fly is a 2017 South Korean crime drama film directed by Ahn Cheol-ho.

Cast
Kim Jin-woo as Kang Hae-wook 
Lee Yeon-doo as Min Soo-kyung 
Jung In-gi as Kang Man-sik 
Kim Hee-jung as Kang Hae-sun 
Kim Young-han as No Jin-han 
Ko Eun-yi as Choi Mi-hye
Kang Dae-yoon as Criminal Intelligence Police

References

External links
 

 

2017 films
South Korean crime drama films
2010s South Korean films